

The following is a list of youth publications, including magazines, journals and books created about youth.

A
Australian Clearinghouse for Youth Studies

B
Bomb The Suburbs

E
Escape From Childhood

F
Framing Youth

J
Juvenile Justice Information Exchange

N
New Games Book

O
 One80

T
The Teenage Liberation Handbook

V
Vertigo (UTS)

Y
Youth: The 26% Solution
Youth Today

See also
List of youth-led media - Includes publications created by youth.
:Category:Young adult literature - Includes publications created for youth.

Publications